El Madania is a municipality in Algiers Province, Algeria. It is administratively part of Sidi M'Hamed district. Its municipal code is 1603 and postal code is 16075. It has a population of 51,404 as of the 1998 census, which gives it 15 seats in the PMA.

Notable people
 Lyès Deriche, 20th-century leader of the Algerian national political movement against the French.

References

Communes of Algiers Province
Algiers Province